Chirag Suri (born 18 February 1995) is an Indian-born cricketer who plays for the United Arab Emirates national cricket team. In January 2021, Suri was named as the vice-captain of the United Arab Emirates cricket team.

Personal life
Suri was born in New Delhi, India. He moved to the UAE with his family in 2004. He attended Repton School Dubai. As of 2013 he was studying business management at Heriot-Watt University Dubai.

International career
Suri represented the United Arab Emirates national under-19 cricket team at the 2014 Under-19 Cricket World Cup.> He made his first-class debut for the UAE senior team against Namibia in the 2015–17 ICC Intercontinental Cup on 16 September 2017.

He made his One Day International (ODI) debut for the United Arab Emirates against the West Indies in the 2018 Cricket World Cup Qualifier on 6 March 2018. In August 2018, he was named in the United Arab Emirates' squad for the 2018 Asia Cup Qualifier tournament. He made his Twenty20 International (T20I) debut for the UAE in a one-off match against Australia on 22 October 2018.

In September 2019, he was named in the United Arab Emirates' squad for the 2019 ICC T20 World Cup Qualifier tournament in the UAE. In December 2020, he was one of ten cricketers to be awarded with a year-long full-time contract by the Emirates Cricket Board.

In February 2022, in the first match against Oman, Suri scored his first century in ODI cricket, with 115 runs.

Franchise career
Suri was one of the six cricketers from ICC associate member countries in the 2017 Indian Premier League auction. In February 2017, He was bought by the Gujarat Lions team for the 2017 Indian Premier League for 10 lakhs (US$).

In June 2019, he was selected to play for the Toronto Nationals franchise team in the 2019 Global T20 Canada tournament.

As a UAE player, Suri also participates in the T10 League.

References

External links
 

Living people
1995 births
Emirati cricketers
United Arab Emirates One Day International cricketers
United Arab Emirates Twenty20 International cricketers
Indian cricketers
People from New Delhi
Cricketers from Delhi
Gujarat Lions cricketers
Indian emigrants to the United Arab Emirates
Indian expatriate sportspeople in the United Arab Emirates